

Events

Pre-1600
1256 – The Augustinian monastic order is constituted at the Lecceto Monastery when Pope Alexander IV issues a papal bull Licet ecclesiae catholicae.
1415 – Religious reformers John Wycliffe and Jan Hus are condemned as heretics at the Council of Constance.
1436 – Assassination of the Swedish rebel (later national hero) Engelbrekt Engelbrektsson
1471 – Wars of the Roses: The Battle of Tewkesbury: Edward IV defeats a Lancastrian Army and kills Edward of Westminster, Prince of Wales.
1493 – Pope Alexander VI divides the New World between Spain and Portugal along the Line of Demarcation.

1601–1900
1626 – Dutch explorer Peter Minuit arrives in New Netherland (present day Manhattan Island) aboard the See Meeuw.
1686 – The Municipality of Ilagan is founded in the Philippines.
1776 – Rhode Island becomes the first American colony to renounce allegiance to King George III.
1799 – Fourth Anglo-Mysore War: The Battle of Seringapatam: The siege of Seringapatam ends when the city is invaded and Tipu Sultan killed by the besieging British army, under the command of General George Harris.
1814 – Emperor Napoleon arrives at Portoferraio on the island of Elba to begin his exile.
  1814   – King Ferdinand VII abolishes the Spanish Constitution of 1812, returning Spain to absolutism.
1836 – Formation of Ancient Order of Hibernians
1859 – The Cornwall Railway opens across the Royal Albert Bridge linking Devon and Cornwall in England.
1869 – The Naval Battle of Hakodate is fought in Japan.
1871 – The National Association, the first professional baseball league, opens its first season in Fort Wayne, Indiana.
1886 – Haymarket affair: In Chicago, United States, a homemade bomb is thrown at police officers trying to break up a labor rally, killing one officer. Ensuing gunfire leads to the deaths of a further seven officers and four civilians.

1901–present
1904 – The United States begins construction of the Panama Canal.
1910 – The Royal Canadian Navy is created.
1912 – Italy occupies the Ottoman island of Rhodes.
1919 – May Fourth Movement: Student demonstrations take place in Tiananmen Square in Beijing, China, protesting the Treaty of Versailles, which transferred Chinese territory to Japan.
1926 – The United Kingdom general strike begins.
1927 – The Academy of Motion Picture Arts and Sciences is incorporated.
1932 – In Atlanta, mobster Al Capone begins serving an eleven-year prison sentence for tax evasion.
1942 – World War II: The Battle of the Coral Sea begins with an attack by aircraft from the United States aircraft carrier  on Japanese naval forces at Tulagi Island in the Solomon Islands. The Japanese forces had invaded Tulagi the day before.
1945 – World War II: Neuengamme concentration camp near Hamburg is liberated by the British Army.
  1945   – World War II: The German surrender at Lüneburg Heath is signed, coming into effect the following day. It encompasses all Wehrmacht units in the Netherlands, Denmark and northwest Germany.
1946 – In San Francisco Bay, U.S. Marines from the nearby Treasure Island Naval Base stop a two-day riot at Alcatraz Federal Penitentiary.  Five people are killed in the riot.
1949 – The entire Torino football team (except for two players who did not take the trip: Sauro Tomà, due to an injury and Renato Gandolfi, because of coach request) is killed in a plane crash.
1953 – Ernest Hemingway wins the Pulitzer Prize for The Old Man and the Sea.
1959 – The 1st Annual Grammy Awards are held.
1961 – American civil rights movement: The "Freedom Riders" begin a bus trip through the South.
1970 – Vietnam War: Kent State shootings: The Ohio National Guard, sent to Kent State University after disturbances in the city of Kent the weekend before, opens fire killing four unarmed students and wounding nine others. The students were protesting the Cambodian Campaign of the United States and South Vietnam.
1972 – The Don't Make A Wave Committee, a fledgling environmental organization founded in Canada in 1971, officially changes its name to "Greenpeace Foundation".
1973 – The 108-story Sears Tower in Chicago is topped out at 1,451 feet as the world's tallest building.
1978 – The South African Defence Force attacks a SWAPO base at Cassinga in southern Angola, killing about 600 people.
1979 – Margaret Thatcher becomes the first female Prime Minister of the United Kingdom.
1982 – Twenty sailors are killed when the British Type 42 destroyer  is hit by an Argentinian Exocet missile during the Falklands War.
1988 – The PEPCON disaster rocks Henderson, Nevada, as tons of Space Shuttle fuel detonate during a fire.
1989 – Iran–Contra affair: Former White House aide Oliver North is convicted of three crimes and acquitted of nine other charges; the convictions are later overturned on appeal.
1990 – Latvia declares independence from the Soviet Union.
1994 – Israeli Prime Minister Yitzhak Rabin and PLO leader Yasser Arafat sign a peace accord, granting self-rule in the Gaza Strip and Jericho.
1998 – A federal judge in Sacramento, California, gives "Unabomber" Theodore Kaczynski four life sentences plus 30 years after Kaczynski accepts a plea agreement sparing him from the death penalty.
2000 – Ken Livingstone becomes the first Mayor of London (an office separate from that of the Lord Mayor of London).
2002 – One hundred three people are killed and 51 are injured in a plane crash near Mallam Aminu Kano International Airport in Kano, Nigeria.
2007 – Greensburg, Kansas is almost completely destroyed by a 1.7-mile wide EF5 tornado. It was the first-ever tornado to be rated as such with the new Enhanced Fujita scale.
2014 – Three people are killed and 62 injured in a pair of bombings on buses in Nairobi, Kenya.
2019 – The inaugural all-female motorsport series, W Series, takes place at Hockenheimring. The race was won by Jamie Chadwick, who would go on to become the inaugural season's champion.

Births

Pre-1600
1006 – Khwaja Abdullah Ansari, Persian mystic and poet (d. 1088)
1559 – Alice Spencer, English noblewoman (d. 1637)

1601–1900
1634 – Katherine Ferrers, English aristocrat and heiress (d. 1660)
1649 – Chhatrasal, Indian ruler (d. 1731)
1655 – Bartolomeo Cristofori, Italian instrument maker, invented the piano (d. 1731)
1677 – Françoise-Marie de Bourbon, French noblewoman (d.1749)
1715 – Richard Graves, English minister and author (d. 1804)
1733 – Jean-Charles de Borda, French mathematician, physicist, and sailor (d. 1799)
1752 – John Brooks, American soldier and politician, 11th Governor of Massachusetts (d. 1825)
1757 – Manuel Tolsá, Spanish sculptor and first director of the Academy of San Carlos in Mexico City (d. 1816)
1767 – Tyagaraja, Indian composer (d. 1847)
1770 – François Gérard, French painter (d. 1837)
1772 – Friedrich Arnold Brockhaus, German publisher (d. 1823)
1796 – Horace Mann, American educator and politician (d. 1859)
  1796   – William Pennington, American lawyer and politician, 13th Governor of New Jersey, 23rd Speaker of the United States House of Representatives (d. 1862)
  1796   – William H. Prescott, American historian and scholar (d. 1859)
1820 – Julia Gardiner Tyler, American wife of John Tyler, 11th First Lady of the United States (d. 1889)
  1820   – John Whiteaker, American soldier, judge, and politician, 1st Governor of Oregon (d. 1902)
1822 – Charles Boucher de Boucherville, Canadian physician and politician, 3rd Premier of Quebec (d. 1915)
1825 – Thomas Henry Huxley, English biologist, anatomist, and academic (d. 1895)
  1825   – Augustus Le Plongeon, English-American historian, photographer, and academic (d. 1908)
1826 – Frederic Edwin Church, American painter (d. 1900)
1827 – John Hanning Speke, English soldier and explorer (d. 1864)
1851 – Thomas Dewing, American painter (d. 1938)
1852 – Alice Liddell, English model (d. 1934)
1883 – Wang Jingwei, Chinese politician (d. 1944)
1884 – Richard Baggallay, English army officer and cricketer (d. 1975)
1887 – Andrew Dasburg, French-American painter (d. 1979)
1889 – Francis Spellman, American cardinal (d. 1967)
1890 – Franklin Carmichael, Canadian painter (d. 1945)

1901–present
1902 – Ronnie Aird, English cricketer and administrator (d. 1986)
  1902   – Cola Debrot, Dutch physician, lawyer, and politician (d. 1981)
  1902   – William Brown Meloney, writer and theatrical producer (d. 1971)
1903 – Luther Adler, American actor (d. 1984)
  1903   – Paul Demel, Czech actor (d. 1951)
1905 – Al Dexter, American country singer-songwriter and guitarist (d. 1984)
1906 – Gustav Bergmann, Austrian-American philosopher from the Vienna Circle (d. 1987)
1907 – Lincoln Kirstein, American soldier and playwright, co-founded the New York City Ballet (d. 1996)
  1907   – Walter Walsh, American target shooter and FBI agent (d. 2014)
1908 – Wolrad Eberle, German decathlete (d. 1949)
1911 – Evald Seepere, Estonian boxer (d. 1990)
1913 – John Broome, American author (d. 1999)
  1913   – Princess Katherine of Greece and Denmark (d. 2007)
1914 – Maedayama Eigorō, Japanese sumo wrestler, the 39th Yokozuna (d. 1971)
1916 – Jane Jacobs, American-Canadian journalist, author, and activist (d. 2006)
  1916   – Richard Proenneke, American soldier, carpenter, and meteorologist (d. 2003)
1917 – Edward T. Cone, American pianist and composer (d. 2004)
  1917   – Nick Joaquin, Filipino writer, journalist and historian (d. 2004)
1918 – Tom Mead, Australian journalist and politician (d. 2004)
  1918   – Kakuei Tanaka, Japanese soldier and politician, 64th Prime Minister of Japan (d. 1993)
1919 – Dory Funk, American wrestler and trainer (d. 1973)
  1919   – Basil Yamey, South African-English economist and academic (d. 2020)
1921 – Patsy Garrett, American actress and singer (d. 2015)
  1921   – John van Kesteren, Dutch-American tenor and actor (d. 2008)
  1921   – Edo Murtić, Croatian painter, sculptor, and illustrator (d. 2005)
1922 – Paul-Émile Charbonneau, Canadian archbishop (d. 2014)
  1922   – Eugenie Clark, American biologist and academic (d. 2015)
1923 – Stanley Biber, American soldier and physician (d. 2006)
  1923   – Ed Cassidy, American jazz and rock drummer (d. 2012)
  1923   – Assi Rahbani, Lebanese composer and producer (d. 1986)
  1923   – Eric Sykes, British actor and comedian (d. 2012)
  1923   – John Toner, American football player and coach (d. 2014)
1925 – Jenő Buzánszky, Hungarian footballer and coach (d. 2015)
  1925   – Maurice R. Greenberg, American businessman and philanthropist
1926 – David Stoddart, Baron Stoddart of Swindon, English politician (d. 2020)
1928 – Maynard Ferguson, Canadian trumpet player and bandleader (d. 2006)
  1928   – Thomas Kinsella, Irish poet, translator, and publisher (d. 2021)
  1928   – Hosni Mubarak, Egyptian air marshal and politician, 4th President of Egypt (d. 2020)
  1928   – Betsy Rawls, American golfer
  1928   – Wolfgang von Trips, German race car driver (d. 1961)
1929 – Manuel Contreras, Chilean general (d. 2015)
  1929   – Audrey Hepburn, Belgian-British actress and humanitarian (d. 1993)
  1929   – Paige Rense, American magazine editor (d. 2021)
1930 – Katherine Jackson, matriarch of the Jackson family
  1930   – Roberta Peters, American soprano (d. 2017)
1931 – Jan Pesman, Dutch speed skater (d. 2014)
  1931   – Gennady Rozhdestvensky, Russian conductor and educator (d. 2018)
  1931   – Thomas Stuttaford, English physician, journalist, and politician (d. 2018)
1932 – Harlon Hill, American football player and coach (d. 2013)
  1932   – Alexander MacAra, Scottish epidemiologist and academic (d. 2012)
1933 – J. Fred Duckett, American journalist and educator (d. 2007)
1936 – El Cordobés, Spanish bullfighter
  1936   – Med Hondo, Mauritanian filmmaker and actor (d. 2019)
1937 – Ron Carter, American bassist and educator
  1937   – Dick Dale, American surf-rock guitarist, singer, and songwriter (d. 2019)
  1937   – Wim Verstappen, Dutch director, producer, and screenwriter (d. 2004)
1938 – Tyrone Davis, American blues and soul singer (d. 2005)
  1938   – Carlos Monsiváis, Mexican journalist, author, and critic (d. 2010)
  1938   – Gillian Tindall, English historian and author
1939 – Neil Fox, English rugby league player and coach
  1939   – Amos Oz, Israeli journalist and author (d. 2018)
  1939   – Leon Rochefort, Canadian ice hockey player
1940 – Robin Cook, American physician and author
  1940   – Peter Gregg, American race car driver and businessman (d. 1980)
1941 – George Will, American journalist and author
1943 – Georgi Asparuhov, Bulgarian footballer (d. 1971)
  1943   – Mihail Chemiakin, Russian painter and sculptor
  1943   – Prasanta Pattanaik, Indian economist and academic
1944 – Walker Boone, Canadian actor (d. 2021)
  1944   – Steve Liebmann, Australian radio and television host
  1944   – Russi Taylor, American voice actress (d. 2019)
1945 – Jan Mulder, Dutch footballer and journalist
1946 – John Barnard, English car designer
  1946   – Gary Bauer, American political activist
  1946   – John Watson, British race car driver
1947 – John Bosley, Canadian businessman and politician, 31st Canadian Speaker of the House of Commons (d. 2022)
  1947   – Ronald Sørensen, Dutch historian and politician
  1947   – Trivimi Velliste, Estonian politician, 17th Estonian Minister of Foreign Affairs
1948 – Alison Britton, English sculptor and educator
  1948   – Hurley Haywood, American race car driver
  1948   – King George Tupou V of Tonga, (d. 2012)
1949 – Graham Swift, English novelist and short story writer
1950 – Darryl Hunt, English bass player
1951 – Colin Bass, English bass player, songwriter, and producer
  1951   – Colleen Hanabusa, American lawyer and politician
  1951   – Jackie Jackson, American singer-songwriter and dancer 
1952 – Belinda Green, Australian beauty queen and 1972 Miss World
1953 – Pia Zadora, American actress and singer 
1954 – Ryan Cayabyab, Filipino pianist, composer, and conductor
  1954   – Trevor Ryan, Australian rugby league player
1956 – Michael L. Gernhardt, American astronaut and engineer
  1956   – David Guterson, American novelist, short story writer, poet, and essayist
  1956   – Ken Oberkfell, American baseball player and coach
1957 – Jaak Huimerind, Estonian architect
  1957   – Kathy Kreiner, Canadian skier
  1957   – Peter Sleep, Australian cricketer
  1957   – Marijke Vos, Dutch educator and politician
1958 – Delbert Fowler, American football player
  1958   – Keith Haring, American painter (d. 1990)
  1958   – Jane Kennedy, English politician
  1958   – Caroline Spelman, English politician, Secretary of State for Environment, Food and Rural Affairs
1959 – Valdemaras Chomičius, Lithuanian basketball player and coach
  1959   – Randy Travis, American singer-songwriter, guitarist, and actor
  1959   – Bob Tway, American golfer
1960 – Werner Faymann, Austrian politician, 28th Chancellor of Austria
1961 – Jay Aston, English singer-songwriter and dancer 
1964 – Silvia Costa, Cuban high jumper
1966 – Gary Elkins, English footballer and manager
  1966   – Jane McGrath, English-Australian activist, co-founded the McGrath Foundation (d. 2008)
1967 – Kate Garraway, English journalist
  1967   – Ana Gasteyer, American actress and singer
1969 – Micah Aivazoff, Canadian ice hockey player
  1969   – Franz Resch, Austrian footballer and manager
1970 – Gregg Alexander, American singer-songwriter and producer
  1970   – Will Arnett, Canadian actor and producer
  1970   – Giovanni Mirabassi, Italian jazz musician
  1970   – Dawn Staley, American basketball player
  1970   – Paul Wiseman, New Zealand cricketer and coach
1971 – Joe Borowski, American baseball player and sportscaster
  1971   – Miles Stewart, Australian triathlete
1972 – Manny Aybar, Dominican baseball player
  1972   – Mike Dirnt, American bass player and songwriter 
1973 – Matthew Barnaby, Canadian ice hockey player and sportscaster
  1973   – Guillermo Barros Schelotto, Argentinian footballer and coach
  1973   – John Madden, Canadian ice hockey player and coach
1974 – Miguel Cairo, Venezuelan baseball player and coach
  1974   – Tony McCoy, Northern Irish jockey and sportscaster
1976 – Ben Grieve, American baseball player
  1976   – Rory Hamill, Northern Irish international footballer
  1976   – Jason Michaels, American baseball player
  1976   – Indrek Visnapuu, Estonian basketball player and coach
1977 – John Tripp, Canadian-German ice hockey player
1978 – Erin Andrews, American sportscaster and journalist
  1978   – Igor Biscan, Croatian footballer
  1978   – Brett Burton, Australian footballer
  1978   – Vladimíra Uhlířová, Czech tennis player
1979 – Lance Bass, American singer, dancer, and producer 
  1979   – Kristin Harmel, American journalist and author
  1979   – Marie Poissonnier, French pole vaulter
  1979   – Lesley Vainikolo, Tongan rugby player
1980 – Andrew Raycroft, Canadian ice hockey player
1981 – Eric Djemba-Djemba, Cameroon footballer
  1981   – Dallon Weekes, American singer-songwriter and musician 
1982 – Kleopas Giannou, Greek footballer
  1982   – Markus Rogan, Austrian swimmer
  1982   – Giorgos Tsiaras, Greek basketball player
1983 – Dan Christian, Australian cricketer
  1983   – Derek Roy, Canadian ice hockey player
  1983   – Robert Zwinkels, Dutch footballer
1984 – Manjural Islam Rana, Bangladeshi cricketer (d. 2007)
  1984   – Brad Maddox, American wrestler and referee
  1984   – Sarah Meier, Swiss figure skater
  1984   – Montell Owens, American football player
  1984   – Kevin Slowey, American baseball player
1985 – Ravi Bopara, English cricketer
  1985   – Anthony Fedorov, Ukrainian-born American singer and actor
  1985   – Fernandinho, Brazilian footballer
  1985   – Lester "Bo" McCalebb, American-Macedonian professional basketball player
  1985   – Jamie Adenuga, English MC and rapper
1986 – Devan Dubnyk, Canadian ice hockey player
  1986   – George Hill, American basketball player
1987 – Cesc Fàbregas, Spanish footballer
  1987   – Jorge Lorenzo, Spanish motorcycle racer
1988 – Radja Nainggolan, Belgian footballer
1989 – Dániel Gyurta, Hungarian swimmer
  1989   – Henna Lindholm, Finnish figure skater
  1989   – Rory McIlroy, Northern Irish golfer
  1989   – Aris Tatarounis, Greek basketball player
  1989   – James van Riemsdyk, American ice hockey player
1990 – Irina Falconi, American tennis player
  1990   – Ryan Morgan, Australian rugby league player
  1990   – Duvashen Padayachee, Australian race car driver
  1990   – Andrea Torres, Filipino actress and model
1991 – Brianne Jenner, Canadian women's ice hockey player
1992 – Victor Oladipo, American basketball player
1993 – Jānis Bērziņš, Latvian basketball player
1994 – Abi Masatora, Japanese sumo wrestler
  1994   – Joseph Tapine, New Zealand rugby league player
1996 – Pelayo Roza, Spanish sprint canoeist
1997 – Max King, Australian rugby league player

Deaths

Pre-1600
 408 – Venerius, archbishop of Milan
 784 – Arbeo, bishop of Freising
1003 – Herman II, duke of Swabia
1038 – Gotthard of Hildesheim, German bishop (b. 960)
1406 – Coluccio Salutati, chancellor of Florence (b. 1331)
1436 – Engelbrekt Engelbrektsson, Swedish rebel leader
1471 – Edward of Westminster, Prince of Wales, son and heir of Henry VI of England (b. 1453)
  1471   – Edmund Beaufort, 4th Duke of Somerset (b. 1438)
1483 – George Neville, Duke of Bedford (b. 1457)
1506 – Husayn Mirza Bayqara, Timurid ruler of Herat (b. 1438)
1519 – Lorenzo de' Medici, duke of Urbino (b. 1492)
1535 – John Houghton, Carthusian monk and saint
1562 – Lelio Sozzini, Italian Protestant theologian (b. 1525)
1566 – Luca Ghini, Italian physician and botanist (b. 1490)
1571 – Pierre Viret, Swiss theologian and reformer (b. 1511)

1601–1900
1604 – Claudio Merulo, Italian organist and composer (b. 1533)
1605 – Ulisse Aldrovandi, Italian naturalist (b. 1522)
1615 – Adriaan van Roomen, Flemish priest and mathematician (b. 1561)
1626 – Arthur Lake, English bishop and scholar (b. 1569)
1677 – Isaac Barrow, English mathematician and theologian (b. 1630)
1684 – John Nevison, English criminal (b. 1639)
1729 – Louis Antoine de Noailles, French cardinal (b. 1651)
1734 – James Thornhill, English painter and politician (b. 1675)
1737 – Eustace Budgell, English journalist and politician (b. 1686)
1774 – Anthony Ulrich of Brunswick, Prussian nobleman (b. 1714)
1776 – Jacques Saly, French painter and sculptor (b. 1717)
1790 – Matthew Tilghman, American politician (b. 1718)
1799 – Tipu, ruler of Mysore (b. 1750)
1811 – Nikolay Kamensky, Russian general (b. 1776)
1816 – Samuel Dexter, American lawyer and politician, 4th United States Secretary of War, 3rd United States Secretary of the Treasury (b. 1761)
1824 – Joseph Joubert, French author (b. 1754)
1826 – Sebastián Kindelán y O'Regan, colonial governor of East Florida, Santo Domingo and Cuba (b. 1757)
1839 – Denis Davydov, Russian general and poet (b. 1784)
1859 – Joseph Diaz Gergonne, French mathematician and philosopher (b. 1771)
1880 – Edward Clark, American lawyer and politician, 8th Governor of Texas (b. 1815)

1901–present
1901 – John Jones Ross, Canadian lawyer and politician, 7th Premier of Quebec (b. 1831)
1903 – Gotse Delchev, Macedonian Bulgarian revolutionary IMRO (b. 1872)
1912 – Nettie Stevens, American geneticist credited with discovering sex chromosomes (b. 1861)
1916 – Ned Daly, Irish rebel commander (Easter Rising) (b. 1891)
  1916   – John Murray, Australian politician, 23rd Premier of Victoria (b. 1851)
  1916   – Willie Pearse, Irish rebel (b. 1881)
  1916   – Joseph Plunkett, Irish rebel and writer (b. 1887)
1919 – Milan Rastislav Štefánik, Slovak general and politician (b. 1880)
1922 – Viktor Kingissepp, Estonian politician (b. 1888)
1923 – Ralph McKittrick, American golfer and tennis player (b. 1877)
1924 – E. Nesbit, English author and poet (b. 1858)
1938 – Kanō Jigorō, Japanese founder of judo (b. 1860)
  1938   – Carl von Ossietzky, German journalist and activist, Nobel Prize laureate (b. 1889)
1941 – Chris McKivat, Australian rugby player and coach (b. 1880)
1945 – Fedor von Bock, German field marshal (b. 1880)
1953 – Alexandre Pharamond, French rugby player (b. 1876)
1955 – George Enescu, Romanian pianist, composer, and conductor (b. 1881)
1964 – Karl Robert Pusta, Estonian politician, 4th Estonian Minister of Foreign Affairs (b. 1883)
1969 – Osbert Sitwell, English-Italian author and poet (b. 1892)
1971 – William Brown Meloney, writer and theatrical producer (b. 1902)
1972 – Father Chrysanthus, Dutch arachnologist (b. 1905)
  1972   – Edward Calvin Kendall, American chemist and academic, Nobel Prize laureate (b. 1886)
1973 – Jane Bowles, American author and playwright (b. 1917)
1975 – Moe Howard, American actor, singer, and screenwriter (b. 1897)
1976 – Frank Strahan, Australian public servant (b. 1886)
1980 – Josip Broz Tito, Yugoslav field marshal and politician, 1st President of Yugoslavia (b. 1892)
1981 – C. Loganathan, Sri Lankan banker (b. 1913)
1983 – Nino Sanzogno, Italian conductor and composer (b. 1911)
1984 – Diana Dors, English actress (b. 1931)
1985 – Fikri Sönmez, Turkish tailor and politician (b. 1938)
  1985   – Clarence Wiseman, English-Canadian 10th General of The Salvation Army (b. 1907)
1987 – Paul Butterfield, American singer and harmonica player (b. 1942)
  1987   – Cathryn Damon, American actress (b. 1930)
1988 – Lillian Estelle Fisher, American historian of Spanish America (b. 1891)
1990 – Emily Remler, American guitarist (b. 1957)
1991 – Mohammed Abdel Wahab, Egyptian singer-songwriter and mandolin player (b. 1902)
1992 – Gregor Mackenzie, Scottish politician (b. 1927)
1993 – France Štiglic, Slovenian film director and screenwriter (b. 1919)
1995 – Connie Wisniewski, American baseball player (b. 1922)
2000 – Hendrik Casimir, Dutch physicist and academic (b. 1909)
2001 – Bonnie Lee Bakley, American model, wife of Robert Blake (b. 1956)
2004 – David Reimer, Canadian man, born male but reassigned female and raised as a girl after a botched circumcision  (b. 1965)
2005 – David Hackworth, American colonel and journalist (b. 1930)
2008 – Fred Baur, American chemist and founder of Pringles (b. 1918)
2009 – Dom DeLuise, American actor, director, and producer (b. 1933)
2011 – Sammy McCrory, Northern Irish footballer (b. 1924)
2012 – Mort Lindsey, American pianist, composer, and conductor (b. 1923)
  2012   – Bob Stewart, American television producer, founded Stewart Tele Enterprises (b. 1920)
  2012   – Adam Yauch, American rapper and director (b. 1964)
  2012   – Rashidi Yekini, Nigerian footballer (b. 1963)
2013 – Otis Bowen, American physician and politician, 44th Governor of Indiana (b. 1918)
  2013   – Christian de Duve, English-Belgian cytologist and biochemist, Nobel Prize laureate (b. 1917)
  2013   – Javier Diez Canseco, Peruvian sociologist and politician (b. 1948)
  2013   – Mario Machado, Chinese-American journalist and actor (b. 1935)
  2013   – Morgan Morgan-Giles, English admiral and politician (b. 1914)
  2013   – César Portillo de la Luz, Cuban guitarist and composer (b. 1922)
2014 – Dick Ayers, American author and illustrator (b. 1924)
  2014   – Elena Baltacha, Ukrainian-Scottish tennis player (b. 1983)
  2014   – Edgar Cortright, American scientist and engineer (b. 1923)
  2014   – Helga Königsdorf, German physicist and author (b. 1938)
  2014   – Ross Lonsberry, Canadian-American ice hockey player (b. 1947)
  2014   – Jean-Paul Ngoupandé, Central African politician, Prime Minister of the Central African Republic (b. 1948)
2015 – William Bast, American screenwriter and author (b. 1931)
  2015   – Ellen Albertini Dow, American actress (b. 1913)
  2015   – Marv Hubbard, American football player (b. 1946)
2016 – Jean-Baptiste Bagaza, Burundian politician (b. 1946)
2020 – Don Shula, American football player and coach (b. 1930)
  2020   – Greg Zanis, American carpenter and activist (b. 1950)
2021 – Nick Kamen, English model, songwriter (b. 1962)

Holidays and observances
Anti-Bullying Day (United Nations)
Bird Day (United States)
Cassinga Day (Namibia)
Christian feast day:
Blessed Ceferino Giménez Malla
Blessed Michal Giedroyc
English Saints and Martyrs of the Reformation Era (Church of England)
F. C. D. Wyneken (Lutheran Church–Missouri Synod)
Florian
José María Rubio
Judas Cyriacus
Monica of Hippo (1960 Roman Catholic Calendar)
Sacerdos of Limoges
Venerius of Milan
May 4 (Eastern Orthodox liturgics)
Coal Miners Day (India)
Death of Milan Rastislav Štefánik Day (Slovakia)
Greenery Day (Japan)
International Firefighters' Day
May Fourth Movement commemorations:
Literary Day (Republic of China)
Youth Day (China)
Remembrance Day for Martyrs and Disabled (Afghanistan)
Remembrance of the Dead (Netherlands)
Restoration of Independence Day (Latvia)
Star Wars Day (International observance)
World Give Day
Youth Day (Fiji)

References

External links

 BBC: On This Day
 
 Historical Events on May 4

Days of the year
May